Baseball-Reference is a website providing baseball statistics for every player in Major League Baseball history. The site is often used by major media organizations and baseball broadcasters as a source for statistics. It offers a variety of advanced baseball sabermetrics in addition to traditional baseball "counting stats".

Baseball-Reference is part of Sports Reference, LLC; according to an article in Street & Smith's Sports Business Journal, the company's sites have more than one million unique users per month.

History
Founder Sean Forman began developing the website while working on his Ph.D. dissertation in applied math and computational science at the University of Iowa. While writing his dissertation, he had also been writing articles on and blogging about sabermetrics. Forman's database was originally built from the Total Baseball series of baseball encyclopedias.

The website went online in April 2000, after first being launched in February 2000 as part of the website for the Big Bad Baseball Annual. It was originally built as a web interface to the Lahman Baseball Database, though it now employs a variety of data sources.

In 2004, Forman founded Sports Reference. Sports Reference is a website that came out of the Baseball Reference website. The company was incorporated as Sports Reference, LLC in 2007. In 2006, Forman left his job as a math professor at Saint Joseph's University in order to focus on Baseball-Reference full-time.

In February 2009, Fantasy Sports Ventures took a minority stake in Sports Reference, LLC, the parent company of Baseball-Reference, for a "low seven-figure sum".

At the end of April 2021, the site changed a number of identifying names, "discontinuing the use of nicknames that are racially or ethnically influenced" and "names based upon a player's disability", such as Chief Bender and Dummy Hoy, who are now listed as Charles Bender and Billy Hoy, respectively.

Features

To compare ballplayers to one-another it offers "Black ink" and "Gray Ink" Tests, which tally a player's dominance and overall productivity against his peers.  It also offers sabremetrician Jay Jaffe's acronymned "JAWS" system for ranking players of different eras against each other by weighting their primes.

In addition, there are a number of what the website calls "Frivolities", e.g., The Oracle of Baseball, which links any two players by common teammates in the way the pop culture favorite "Oracle of Bacon" website does. Another one of their Frivolities is the page devoted to Keith Hernandez's mustache, which is the only "fictional" page on Baseball-Reference.

Bullpen
Baseball-Reference has its own baseball encyclopedia, a wiki called "Baseball Reference Bullpen", which can be edited by anyone and is modeled after Wikipedia. As of July 2015, the Baseball Reference Bullpen contains over 77,200 articles.

References

External links
 

Major League Baseball websites
Baseball websites
Baseball statistics
Fantasy sports
Internet properties established in 2000